Samson "Sammy" Sergi (born July 2, 1996) is an American soccer player who is currently without a club.

Career

College
Sergi played four years of college soccer at the Xavier between 2015 and 2019, where he made 67 appearances, scored 29 goals and tallied five assists.

While at college, Sergi also appeared for USL PDL side Cincinnati Dutch Lions during their 2017 season.

Professional
On January 16, 2020, he signed with New Mexico United of the USL Championship, after finishing his college soccer career with Xavier.

Sergi made his professional debut against Austin Bold FC on March 7, 2020. He came on as a 70th minute substitute replacing Andrew Tinari in a 1–0 defeat for New Mexico United.

On February 11, 2021, Sergi signed with local club Loudoun United. Sergi was released at the end of the season.

References

1996 births
Living people
People from Ashburn, Virginia
American soccer players
Association football forwards
Soccer players from Virginia
USL League Two players
USL Championship players
Xavier Musketeers men's soccer players
Cincinnati Dutch Lions players
New Mexico United players
Loudoun United FC players